Huaynamota Indians are a subdivision of the Cora Indians on an east branch of the Río Grande de Santiago, Jalisco, Mexico.

Ethnic groups in Mexico